Events in the year 1926 in Brazil.

Incumbents

Federal government 
 President: Artur Bernardes (until 14 November); Washington Luís (from 15 November)
 Vice President: Estácio de Albuquerque Coimbra (until 14 November); Fernando de Melo Viana (from 15 November)

Governors 
 Alagoas: Pedro da Costa Rego
 Amazonas: Alfredo Sá (till 1 January); Ifigênio Ferreira de Sales (from 1 January)
 Bahia: Góis Calmon
 Ceará: José Moreira da Rocha
 Goiás: Brasil Caiado
 Maranhão: Godofredo Mendes Viana (till 1 March); José Magalhães de Almeida (from 1 March)
 Mato Grosso: Estêvão Alves Correia, then Mário Correia da Costa
 Minas Gerais: Fernando de Mello Viana (till 7 September); Antônio Carlos Ribeiro de Andrada (from 7 September)
 Pará: Dionísio Bentes
 Paraíba: João Suassuna
 Paraná: Caetano Munhoz da Rocha
 Pernambuco: Sérgio Teixeira Lins de Barros Loreto (till 18 October); Júlio de Melo (18 October - 12 December); Estácio Coimbra (from 12 December)
 Piauí: Matias Olímpio de Melo
 Rio Grande do Norte: José Augusto Bezerra de Medeiros
 Rio Grande do Sul: Antônio Augusto Borges de Medeiros
 Santa Catarina:
 São Paulo: Carlos de Campos (in exile)
 Sergipe:

Vice governors 
 Rio Grande do Norte:
 São Paulo:

Events 
21 January - Rádio Mayrink Veiga begins broadcasting in Rio de Janeiro.
1 March - In the presidential election, Washington Luís of the Republican Party of São Paulo, who received 98.0% of the vote.

Arts and culture

Films 
Corações em Suplício, directed by Eugenio Centenaro Kerrigan
O Guaraní, directed by Vittorio Capellaro

Births 
17 January - Maria d'Apparecida, opera singer (died 2017)
20 April - Miriam Pires, actress (died 2004)
21 October - Waldir Pires, politician (died 2018)
24 October - Francisco de Assis Couto dos Reis, architect and teacher (died 2011)
November - Miguel Torres de Andrade, writer and actor (died 1962)

Deaths 
30 July - Lauro Müller, politician, diplomat, and military engineer (born 1863)

References

See also 
1926 in Brazilian football

 
1920s in Brazil
Years of the 20th century in Brazil
Brazil
Brazil